Guadalupe County was one of the original 17 counties created by the Territory of Colorado in 1861.  Guadalupe County existed for only six days before being renamed Conejos County.

History
On 1861-11-01, the Colorado General Assembly created Guadalupe County and 16 other counties as the first counties of the Territory of Colorado.  Six days later on 1861-11-07, the Colorado General Assembly decided to change the name of Guadalupe County to Conejos County.

See also

Outline of Colorado
Index of Colorado-related articles
Historic Colorado counties
Conejos County, Colorado

References

Former counties of Colorado
Conejos County, Colorado
1861 establishments in Colorado Territory